Trio Vegabajeño was a legendary Puerto Rican popular music trio that existed from 1943 to the early 80s.
This group marked an era of popular music in Puerto Rico. When trios were very popular in the Americas, Trio Vegabajeño was considered the ambassadors from Puerto Rico.

Vegabajeño is the demonym for people of the town of Vega Baja.

Eventually they were recognized as the National Trio of Puerto Rico and on October 26, 1996, a monument was inaugurated in Vega Baja.

History
Trio Vegabajeño was informally formed in 1943 at the Tortuguero Military Camp of Vega Baja by Fernandito Álvarez who gathered a few co-workers (Octavio González and Benito de Jesús) to put together a few musical numbers. A friend, Rafael Quiñones Vidal, came up with the name for the trio.  Shortly after they recorded their first song "Llanto de mar". At the time only Fernandito Alvarez and  Benito de Jesus did both vocals and guitar while Octavio González only played guitar.

In 1945 Octavio González was recruited by the US Army and the trio brought Pepito Maduro, also a singer, as the replacement. The group now had an all singers line-up and became pioneers of this new style. During this line-up Guillermo Venegas Lloveras composed  their theme song Tema - Trío Vegabajeño in which aside from describing the town of Vega Baja they also state what town is each one from:

[Fernandito] "Yo soy de Vega Baja (I am from Vega Baja)
[Benito] Barceloneta es mi pueblo (Barceloneta is my town)
[Pepito] Humacao fue mi cuna (Humacao was my cradle)..."

Although being a trio, the group became a quartet in 1952 when Jorge Hernandez (requinto player) joined the group. They didn't change the name of the group.  This was one of their most successful line-up and even though was not the original, it was sometimes referred to as the "original" or "authentic" line-up.

After the departure of Jorge and Benito, the trio had different line-ups.

The only living member of the quartet line-up (1952–65) is Jorge Hernandez. In 2002, the group was inducted into the International Latin Music Hall of Fame.

En Mi Viejo San Juan

"En mi Viejo San Juan" (In my Old San Juan) was first recorded by El Trio Vagabajeño in 1943 under the label RCA Victor. The song had an immediate impact and many other versions followed.

The composition was written by Puerto Rican composer and singer Noel Estrada and has been translated into various languages. The song is "widely known around the world".

Line-ups
Note: this list of line-ups is incomplete.

1943-45:
 Fernandito Alvarez 
 Benito de Jesús 
 Octavio González

1945-52:
 Fernandito Alvarez 
 Benito de Jesús 
 Pepito Maduro

1952-65:
 Fernandito Alvarez
 Benito de Jesús 
 Pepito Maduro 
 Jorge Hernandez

1965-80:
 Fernandito Alvarez 
 Ruben Maldonado
 Guillermo Rivera

1980:
 Fernandito Alvarez 
 Ruben Maldonado
 Nacho Carrasquillo

1986 reunion (same as 1952-65):
 Fernandito Alvarez
 Benito de Jesús
 Pepito Maduro
 Jorge Hernandez

Discography

The original line-up (Alvarez, De Jesús and Maduro) only got to record 78 RPM records. The following discography only covers the records in LP format with the Marvela label which started once the fourth member, Jorge Hernandez, joined in 1952.

 Canta El Trio Vegabajeño (c. 1952)
 Canta El Trio Vegabajeño Vol. 2 (c. 1954)
 Canta El Trio Vegabajeño Vol. 3 (c. 1955)
 Canta El Trio Vegabajeño Vol. 4 (c. 1957)

Their song "Cantares de Navidad" was featured as the last song of Bad Bunny's album El Último Tour Del Mundo.

Reunion
In 1986 one of the classic line-ups (Fernandito, Benito, Pepito and Jorge) reunited to record a song ("Medley Trio Vegabajeño") with Danny Rivera for the album Ofrenda. Aside from that, two of the other songs were composed by members of the trio: "Meleque" (by Pepito Maduro) and "Que Lindas Son Las Mañanas" (by Benito de Jesús).

References

Puerto Rican musical groups